Notosetia is a genus of minute sea snails or micromolluscs, marine gastropod molluscs in the family Turbinidae.

Species
 Notosetia aoteana Powell, 1937
 Notosetia neozelanica Suter, 1898
 Notosaria nigricans Sowerby, 1846
 Notosaria reinga Lee & Wilson, 1979

Species brought into synonymy
 Notosetia electra W. R. B. Oliver, 1915: synonym of Rastodens electra (W. R. B. Oliver, 1915)
 Notosetia foveauxana E. C. Smith, 1962: synonym of Powellisetia subtenuis (Powell, 1937)
 Notosetia fulva Laseron, 1950: synonym of Rissoella micra (Finlay, 1924)
 Notosetia ghanensis Rolán & Ryall, 2000: synonym of Ponderinella ghanensis (Rolán & Ryall, 2000)
 Notosetia infecta (Suter, 1908): synonym of Pusillina (Haurakia) infecta (Suter, 1908): synonym of Haurakia infecta (Suter, 1908)
 Notosetia lineata (Smith, E. C., 1962): synonym of Powellisetia lineata (E. C. Smith, 1962)
 Notosetia pellucida Laseron, 1950: synonym of Rissoella secunda (Iredale, 1912)
 Notosetia ponderi: synonym of Powellisetia ponderi Numanami, 1996
 Notosetia porcellana : synonym of Powellisetia porcellana (Suter, 1908)
 Notosetia pupinella Finlay, 1927: synonym of Pupatonia pupinella (Finlay, 1927)
 Notosetia retusa Powell, 1927: synonym of Powellisetia retusa (Powell, 1927)
 Notosetia unicarinata Powell, 1930: synonym of Powellisetia unicarinata (Powell, 1930)
 Notosetia castanea Laseron, 1950 
 Notosetia fairchildi Powell, 1933 
 Notosetia foveauxana Smith, E. C., 1962
 Notosetia nitens

References

 Powell A. W. B., New Zealand Mollusca, William Collins Publishers Ltd, Auckland, New Zealand 1979 
 ZipCodeZoo
 Tepapa
 Rolán E. & Ryall P. (2000). A new species of the genus Notosetia (Molluscs, Skeneidae) from Ghana. Argonauta 14(2): 39-41.
 Ponder W. F. (1985). A review of the Genera of the Rissoidae (Mollusca: Mesogastropoda: Rissoacea). Records of the Australian Museum supplement 4: 1-221, available online at http://australianmuseum.net.au/journal/Ponder-1985-Rec-Aust-Mus-Suppl-4-1221/ page(s): 100

 
Gastropods of New Zealand